USS Bell (DD-95) was a  built for the United States Navy during World War I.

Description
The Wickes class was an improved and faster version of the preceding . Two different designs were prepared to the same specification that mainly differed in the turbines and boilers used. The ships built to the Bethlehem Steel design, built in the Fore River and Union Iron Works shipyards, mostly used Yarrow boilers that deteriorated badly during service and were mostly scrapped during the 1930s. They had a crew of 6 officers and 108 enlisted men.

Performance differed radically between the ships of the class, often due to poor workmanship. The Wickes class was powered by two steam turbines, each driving one propeller shaft, using steam provided by four water-tube boilers.

The ships were armed with four 4-inch (102 mm) guns in single mounts and were fitted with two  1-pounder guns for anti-aircraft defense. Their primary weapon, though, was their torpedo battery of a dozen 21 inch (533 mm) torpedo tubes in four triple mounts. In many ships a shortage of 1-pounders caused them to be replaced by 3-inch (76 mm) anti-aircraft (AA) guns. They also carried a pair of depth charge rails. A "Y-gun" depth charge thrower was added to many ships.

Construction and career
Bell, named for Rear Admiral Henry H. Bell, was launched 20 April 1918 by Bethlehem Shipbuilding Corporation, Fore River Shipyard, Quincy, Massachusetts; sponsored by Mrs. Josephus Daniels, wife of the Secretary of the Navy, Josephus Daniels, and commissioned 31 July 1918.

On 5 August 1918 she damaged the steam lighter Cornelia in a collision. Cornelia had to be beached on Deer Island, in the harbor at Boston, Massachusetts.
From August to November 1918 Bell convoyed troop ships across the North Atlantic and in December formed part of the escort for George Washington carrying President Woodrow Wilson from New York to Brest, France. Bell continued serving with the Atlantic Fleet until placed in reserve in June 1920. She was decommissioned at Portsmouth Navy Yard 21 June 1922. Bell remained out of commission until August 1936 when she was declared in excess of the limits imposed by the London Naval Treaty of 1930 and reduced to a hulk. She was subsequently sold.

Notes

References

External links
 NavSource Photos

 

Wickes-class destroyers
World War I destroyers of the United States
Ships built in Quincy, Massachusetts
1918 ships